91 Members of Parliament (MPs) chose to not seek reelection at the 2015 general election, meaning they were MPs in the 55th Parliament, but chose not to contest the 2015 general election (in some cases after being deselected by their parties). While at the previous election there had been a record 149 MPs not standing for reelection, the 91 standing down in 2015 represented a more usual number. These 91 consist of 39 Labour, 37 Conservative, 10 Liberal Democrat, 3 Independent, 1 Sinn Féin and 1 Plaid Cymru MP. There were no vacant seats at dissolution.

The highest profile Members of Parliament leaving were Gordon Brown, a former Prime Minister, Leader of the Labour Party (both 2007 to 2010) and Chancellor of the Exchequer (1997 to 2007); and William Hague, the outgoing First Secretary of State and Leader of the House of Commons and former Secretary of State for Foreign and Commonwealth Affairs (2010 to 2014), Leader of the Conservative Party and Leader of the Opposition (both 1997 to 2001).

Alongside Brown and Hague, seventeen former cabinet ministers stood down at the election, including Stephen Dorrell, Jack Straw, Alistair Darling, David Blunkett, Sir Peter Tapsell (the Father of the House having served continuously since the 1966 general election, in addition to his previous service), Sir Malcolm Rifkind and Dame Tessa Jowell, all of whom had served at least 23 years in the House of Commons. The highest profile Liberal Democrat to stand down was former leader Sir Menzies Campbell.

List of MPs 
In total, 91 members of parliament decided not to stand for re-election.

Notes

References 

2015 United Kingdom general election
Lists of UK MPs 2010–2015